Feuerborniella is a genus of flies belonging to the family Psychodidae.

Distribution
The species of this genus are found in Europe, Asia, Norther and Southern America.

Species
Feuerborniella amblytes (Quate, 1999)
Feuerborniella ancepitis (Quate, 1996)
Feuerborniella bicuspis (Quate, 1996)
Feuerborniella concava Cordeiro & Bravo, 2015
Feuerborniella hamata (Quate, 1996)
Feuerborniella jezeki Cordeiro & Bravo, 2015
Feuerborniella malayensis (Satchell, 1955)
Feuerborniella oblongola (Bravo, Chagas & Cordeiro, 2006)
Feuerborniella obscura (Tonnoir, 1919)
Feuerborniella opposita (Banks, 1901)
Feuerborniella pandiculata (Quate, 1996)
Feuerborniella paramuna Cordeiro, 2014
Feuerborniella pilosella Cordeiro & Bravo, 2015
Feuerborniella plaumanni (Duckhouse, 1968)
Feuerborniella pollicaris (Quate, 1996)
Feuerborniella retusa (Quate, 1996)
Feuerborniella spathipenis (Duckhouse, 1968)
Feuerborniella uncinata (Bravo, Chagas & Cordeiro, 2006)
Feuerborniella veracruzana Ibáñez-Bernal, 2004
Feuerborniella vieirai (Chagas, Bravo & Rafael, 2009)

References

Nematocera genera
Diptera of Asia
Diptera of Europe
Diptera of North America
Diptera of South America
Psychodidae